Samaretta perexilis is a species of fish in the family Samaridae found from deep-waters from submarine mountains of the southern eastern Pacific. This species is the only member of its genus.

References

Marine fish genera
Monotypic fish genera
Samaridae
Fish described in 2017